Lionel Smith Beale (5 February 1828 – 28 March 1906) was a British physician, microscopist, and professor at King's College London. He graduated in medicine from King's College in 1851. He was elected a Fellow of the Royal Society in 1857.

Life

Lionel Smith Beale was born in London on 5 February 1828, son of Lionel John Beale, a member of the Royal College of Surgeons.
He attended King's College School and King's College London, where he obtained a degree in medicine.
He also studied zoology at King's College.

A year after graduating, Beale used his own funds to set up a laboratory for chemical and microscopic research and teaching.
In 1853, when he was 25, King's College appointed him Professor of Physiology and General and Morbid Anatomy.
In 1857 Beale was the founding editor of Archives of Medicine.
He promised the readers of this journal that it would be "freely illustrated" since "drawings are really of much more use than long descriptions".

Beale was physician to King's College Hospital for forty years.
At King's College, he became Professor of Pathology and then Professor of the Principle and Practice of Medicine until 1896, when he resigned.
Beale was awarded the Baly medal in 1871. He was Croonian Lecturer to the Royal Society, 1865, President of the Quekett Microscopical Club, 1870–1871, Lumleian Lecturer at the Royal College of Physicians, 1875, President of the Royal Microscopical Society, 1879, and Government medical referee for England, 1891–1904.

Beale married Frances, daughter of Dr. Blakiston, F.R.S. 
His son, Peyton T. B. Beale, also became a surgeon. 
He died on 28 March 1906 at the age of 78.

Work

In writing, teaching and public speaking, Beale was a leading proponent of the scientific method in medicine. 
He was a strong advocate of the value of microscopy, which he felt to be essential to understanding morbid growths and diseases.
In his 1854 book The Microscope in its Applications to Practical Medicine, Beale described the cell as a perfectly closed sac containing a nucleus, which in turn usually contained a clear bright spot, the nucleolus. He classified cells by shape as well as by the part of the body they came from, and discussed ways in which cancerous cells could be distinguished from benign changes with similar clinical appearance. In 1860 he found and described cancer cells in sputum.

Beale pioneered differential staining. From observing the differences in the way in which active, living organisms responded to staining compared with nonliving organisms, he concluded that the nucleus must hold the "bioplasm", or the essence of life.
He was a passionate and vocal advocate of the view that there is an essential difference between living and inert matter.  
He felt that there were reasons to doubt the evidence for human evolution. Beale has been described as a "staunch vitalist". He believed in a "vital force", saying, 

He said,

Publications
The Microscope, and Its Application to Clinical Medicine (1854)
How to Work with the Microscope (5th ed., 1880, 1st pub. 1857)
Illustrations to How to Work with the Microscope (1859)
On the Scientific Investigation of Disease in Animals and Man (1865)
The Microscope in its Application to Practical Medicine (1867)
Protoplasm: Or, Life, Force, and Matter (1870)
Disease Germs: Their Real Nature (1870)
The Mystery of Life (1871)
Life Theories: Their Influence Upon Religious Thought (1871)
Bioplasm: An Introduction to the Study of Physiology & Medicine (1872)
The Microscope in Medicine (1878)
On Slight Ailments (1882)
Urinary and Renal Derangements and Calculous Disorders (1885)
Our Morality and the Moral Question (1893)
The New Materialism: Dictatorial Scientific Utterances and the Decline of Thought (1899)

Notes and references

Citations

Sources

Further reading

Gerald L. Geison. (1969). The Protoplasmic Theory of Life and the Vitalist-Mechanist Debate. Isis 60 (3): 272–292.

1828 births
1906 deaths
19th-century English medical doctors
Academics of King's College London
Alumni of King's College London
Fellows of the Royal Microscopical Society
Fellows of the Royal Society
People educated at King's College School, London
Medical doctors from London
Vitalists